List of bird genera concerns the chordata class of aves or birds, characterised by feathers, a beak with no teeth, the laying of hard-shelled eggs, and a high metabolic rate.

Accipitriformes

Eagles, Old World vultures, secretary-birds, hawks, harriers, etc.

Family Accipitridae - buzzards, eagles, harriers, hawks, kites, Old World vultures
 Genus Accipiter
 Genus Aegypius
 Genus Aquila
 Genus Aviceda
 Genus Busarellus
 Genus Butastur
 Genus Buteo (probably paraphyletic, might include Leucopternis in part and Parabuteo)
 Genus Buteogallus (probably paraphyletic, might include Leucopternis in part)
 Genus Chelictinia
 Genus Chondrohierax
 Genus Circaetus
 Genus Circus
 Genus Clanga
 Genus Cryptoleucopteryx – plumbeous hawk
 Genus Elanoides - swallow-tailed kite
 Genus Elanus
 Genus Erythrotriorchis
 Genus Eutriorchis - Madagascan serpent eagle
 Genus Gampsonyx - pearl kite
 Genus Geranoaetus
 Genus Geranospiza - crane hawk
 Genus Gypaetus - bearded vulture
 Genus Gypohierax - palm-nut vulture
 Genus Gyps
 Genus Haliaeetus - sea eagles
 Genus Haliastur
 Genus Hamirostra - black-breasted buzzard
 Genus Harpagus
 Genus Harpia - harpy eagle
 Genus Harpyhaliaetus
 Genus Harpyopsis - Papuan eagle
 Genus Helicolestes – slender-billed kite, formerly included in Rostrhamus
 Genus Henicopernis
 Genus Hieraaetus
 Genus Ictinaetus - black eagle
 Genus Ictinia
 Genus Kaupifalco - lizard buzzard
 Genus Leptodon
 Genus Leucopternis (probably polyphyletic)
 Genus Lophaetus - long-crested eagle (possibly junior synonym of Ictinaetus)
 Genus Lophoictinia - square-tailed kite
 Genus Lophotriorchis - rufous-bellied eagle
 Genus Macheiramphus - bat hawk (was doubtfully placed, moved from Perninae)
 Genus Megatriorchis - Doria's goshawk
 Genus Melierax
 Genus Micronisus - Gabar goshawk
 Genus Milvus
 Genus Morphnarchus – barred hawk
 Genus Morphnus - crested eagle
 Genus Necrosyrtes - hooded vulture
 Genus Neophron - Egyptian vulture
 Genus Nisaetus
 Genus Parabuteo
 Genus Pernis
 Genus Pithecophaga
 Genus Polemaetus
 Genus Polyboroides
 Genus Pseudastur
 Genus Rostrhamus - snail kite
 Genus Rupornis – roadside hawk
 Genus Sarcogyps - red-headed vulture
 Genus Spilornis
 Genus Spizaetus
 Genus Stephanoaetus
 Genus Terathopius - bateleur
 Genus Torgos - lappet-faced vulture
 Genus Trigonoceps - white-headed vulture
 Genus Urotriorchis - long-tailed hawk
 Family Cathartidae - New World vultures
 Genus Cathartes
 Genus Coragyps - black vulture
 Genus Gymnogyps
 Genus Sarcoramphus - king vulture
 Genus Vultur - Andean condor
 Family Pandionidae - osprey
 Genus Pandion
 Family Sagittariidae - secretarybird
 Genus Sagittarius

Anseriformes

Waterfowl

 Family Anhimidae - screamers
 Genus Anhima - horned screamer
 Genus Chauna
 Family Anatidae
 Genus Aix - Mandarin duck and wood duck – dabbling ducks or Tadorninae?
 Genus Alopochen - Egyptian goose and Mascarene shelducks
 Genus Amazonetta - Brazilian teal
 Genus Anas - pintails, mallards, etc.
 Genus Anser - grey geese and white geese
 Genus Aythya - pochards, scaups, etc.
 Genus Biziura - musk ducks
 Genus Branta - black geese
 Genus Bucephala - goldeneyes
 Genus Cairina - Muscovy duck and white-winged duck  (traditionally dabbling ducks, but may be paraphyletic)
 Genus Callonetta - ringed teal (dabbling ducks or Tadorninae?)
 Genus Cereopsis - Cape Barren goose (Anserinae, Tadorninae, or own subfamily?)
 Genus Chenonetta - maned duck (dabbling ducks or Tadorninae? Includes Euryanas.)
 Genus Chloephaga - sheldgoose
 Genus Clangula - long-tailed duck
 Genus Coscoroba - coscoroba swan (Anserinae or same subfamily as Cereopsis?)
 Genus Cyanochen - blue-winged goose (Tadorninae or more distant clade?)
 Genus Cygnus - true swans
 Genus Dendrocygna - whistling ducks
 Genus Heteronetta - black-headed duck
 Genus Histrionicus - harlequin duck (includes Ocyplonessa)
 Genus Hymenolaimus - blue duck
 Genus Lophodytes - hooded merganser
 Genus Lophonetta - crested duck
 Genus Malacorhynchus - pink-eared ducks (Tadorninae, Oxyurinae or Dendrocheninae?)
 Genus Mareca - wigeons and gadwalls
 Genus Marmaronetta - marbled duck
 Genus Melanitta - scoters
 Genus Merganetta - torrent duck
 Genus Mergellus - smew
 Genus Mergus - mergansers
 Genus Neochen
 Genus Netta - red-crested pochard and allies
 Genus Nettapus - pygmy geese
 Genus Nomonyx - masked duck
 Genus Oxyura - stiff-tailed ducks
 Genus Plectropterus - spur-winged goose
 Genus Polysticta - Steller's eider
 Genus Pteronetta - Hartlaub's duck
 Genus Radjah - Radjah shelduck
 Genus Salvadorina - Salvadori's teal
 Genus Sarkidiornis - comb duck (Tadorninae or closer to dabbling ducks?)
 Genus Sibirionetta - Baikal teal
 Genus Somateria - eiders
 Genus Spatula - shovelers
 Genus Speculanas - bronze-winged duck
 Genus Stictonetta - freckled duck
 Genus Tachyeres - steamer ducks (Tadorninae or closer to dabbling ducks?)
 Genus Tadorna - shelducks (possibly paraphyletic)
 Genus Thalassornis - white-backed duck
 Family Anseranatidae
 Genus Anseranas

Apodiformes

Swifts, treeswifts and hummingbirds

 Family Apodidae - swifts
 Genus Aerodramus sometimes included in Collocalia
 Genus Aeronautes
 Genus Apus
 Genus Chaetura
 Genus Collocalia
 Genus Cypseloides
 Genus Cypsiurus
 Genus Hirundapus
 Genus Hydrochous - giant swiftlet
 Genus Mearnsia
 Genus Neafrapus
 Genus Panyptila
 Genus Rhaphidura
 Genus Schoutedenapus - African swiftlets
 Genus Streptoprocne
 Genus Tachornis
 Genus Tachymarptis
 Genus Telacanthura
 Genus Zoonavena
 Family Hemiprocnidae - treeswifts
 Genus Hemiprocne
 Family Trochilidae - hummingbirds
 Genus Abeillia – emerald-chinned hummingbird
 Genus Adelomyia – speckled hummingbird
 Genus Aglaeactis – sunbeams
 Genus Aglaiocercus – sylphs
 Genus Amazilia (includes Agyrtria)
 Genus Androdon – tooth-billed hummingbird
 Genus Anopetia – broad-tipped hermit
 Genus Anthocephala – blossomcrowns
 Genus Anthracothorax – mangos
 Genus Aphantochroa – sombre hummingbird
 Genus Archilochus
 Genus Atthis
 Genus Augastes – visorbearers
 Genus Avocettula – fiery-tailed awlbill
 Genus Basilinna (recently split from Hylocharis)
 Genus Boissonneaua – coronets
 Genus Calliphlox – Calliphlox woodstars
 Genus Calothorax – Calothorax sheartails
 Genus Calypte
 Genus Campylopterus – sabrewings
 Genus Chaetocercus – Chaetocercus woodstars
 Genus Chalcostigma – Chalcostigma thornbills
 Genus Chalybura – plumeleteers
 Genus Chlorestes – blue-chinned sapphire
 Genus Chlorostilbon – typical emeralds
 Genus Chrysolampis – ruby-topaz hummingbird
 Genus Chrysuronia – golden-tailed sapphire
 Genus Clytolaema – Brazilian ruby
 Genus Coeligena – Incas and starfrontlets
 Genus Colibri – violet-ears
 Genus Cyanophaia - blue-headed hummingbird
 Genus Cynanthus
 Genus Damophila – violet-bellied hummingbird
 Genus Discosura – thorntails
 Genus Doricha – typical sheartails
 Genus Doryfera – lancebills
 Genus Elvira – elvira emeralds
 Genus Ensifera – sword-billed hummingbird
 Genus Eriocnemis – typical pufflegs
 Genus Eugenes
 Genus Eulampis – caribs
 Genus Eulidia – Chilean woodstar
 Genus Eupetomena – swallow-tailed hummingbird
 Genus Eupherusa
 Genus Eutoxeres – sicklebills
 Genus Florisuga – jacobins
 Genus Glaucis
 Genus Goethalsia – pirre hummingbird
 Genus Goldmania – violet-capped hummingbird
 Genus Haplophaedia – Haplophaedia pufflegs
 Genus Heliactin – horned sungem
 Genus Heliangelus – sunangels
 Genus Heliodoxa – brilliants
 Genus Heliomaster – starthroats
 Genus Heliothryx – fairies
 Genus Hylocharis – typical sapphires
 Genus Hylonympha – scissor-tailed hummingbird
 Genus Klais – violet-headed hummingbird
 Genus Lafresnaya – mountain velvetbreast
 Genus Lampornis – typical mountaingems
 Genus Lamprolaima – garnet-throated hummingbird
 Genus Lepidopyga
 Genus Lesbia – trainbearers
 Genus Leucippus
 Genus Leucochloris – white-throated hummingbird
 Genus Loddigesia – marvelous spatuletail
 Genus Lophornis – coquettes
 Genus Mellisuga
 Genus Metallura – metaltails
 Genus Microchera – snowcap
 Genus Microstilbon – slender-tailed woodstar
 Genus Myrmia – short-tailed woodstar
 Genus Myrtis – purple-collared woodstar
 Genus Ocreatus – booted racket-tails
 Genus Opisthoprora – mountain avocetbill
 Genus Oreonympha – bearded mountaineer
 Genus Oreotrochilus – hillstars
 Genus Orthorhyncus – Antillean crested hummingbird
 Genus Oxypogon – bearded helmetcrests
 Genus Panterpe – fiery-throated hummingbird
 Genus Patagona – giant hummingbird
 Genus Phaeochroa – scaly-breasted hummingbird
 Genus Phaethornis – typical hermits
 Genus Phlogophilus – piedtails
 Genus Polyonymus – bronze-tailed comet
 Genus Polytmus – goldenthroats
 Genus Pterophanes – great sapphirewing
 Genus Ramphodon – saw-billed hermit
 Genus Ramphomicron – typical thornbills
 Genus Rhodopis – oasis hummingbird
 Genus Sappho – red-tailed comet
 Genus Schistes - wedgebills (sometimes included in Augastes)
 Genus Selasphorus
 Genus Sephanoides – firecrowns
 Genus Stephanoxis – plovercrests
 Genus Sternoclyta – violet-chested hummingbird
 Genus Taphrolesbia – grey-bellied comet
 Genus Taphrospilus - many-spotted hummingbird
 Genus Thalurania – woodnymphs
 Genus Thaumastura – Peruvian sheartail
 Genus Threnetes – barbthroats
 Genus Tilmatura – sparkling-tailed woodstar
 Genus Topaza – topazes
 Genus Trochilus – streamertails
 Genus Urochroa – white-tailed hillstar
 Genus Urosticte – whitetips

Apterygiformes

 Family Apterygidae
 Genus Apteryx - kiwi

Bucerotiformes

Hornbills, hoopoes, and wood-hoopoes

 Family Bucerotidae
 Genus Aceros - rufous-necked hornbill
 Genus Anorrhinus - brown hornbill
 Genus Anthracoceros - pied hornbill
 Genus Berenicornis - white-crowned hornbill (sometimes included in Aceros)
 Genus Buceros
 Genus Bycanistes 
 Genus Ceratogymna - casqued hornbill
 Genus Lophoceros
 Genus Ocyceros - grey hornbill
 Genus Penelopides
 Genus Rhinoplax - helmeted hornbill (sometimes included in Buceros)
 Genus Rhyticeros (sometimes included in Aceros)
 Genus Tockus
 Genus Tropicranus - white-crested hornbill (sometimes included in Tockus)
 Family Bucorvidae
 Genus Bucorvus - ground hornbills
 Family Phoeniculidae
 Genus Phoeniculus - wood hoopoes
 Genus Rhinopomastus - scimitarbills
 Family Upupidae
 Genus Upupa - hoopoes

Caprimulgiformes

Nightjars, nighthawks, potoos, oilbirds, frogmouths and owlet-nightjars

Family Aegothelidae - owlet-nightjars
Genus Aegotheles
Family Caprimulgidae - nightjars
Genus Antrostomus
Genus Caprimulgus
Genus Chordeiles
Genus Eleothreptus
Genus Eurostopodus
Genus Gactornis – collared nightjar
Genus Hydropsalis
Genus Lurocalis
Genus Lyncornis
Genus Macropsalis – long-trained nightjar
Genus Nyctidromus
Genus Nyctiphrynus
Genus Nyctipolus
Genus Nyctiprogne
Genus Phalaenoptilus – common poorwill
Genus Setopagis
Genus Siphonorhis
Genus Systellura
Genus Uropsalis
Family Nyctibiidae - potoos
Genus Nyctibius
Family Podargidae - frogmouths
Genus Batrachostomus
Genus Podargus
Genus Rigidipenna - Solomons frogmouth
Family Steatornithidae - oilbird
Genus Steatornis

Cariamiformes

Family Cariamidae - seriemas
Genus Cariama
Genus Chunga

Casuariiformes

Cassowaries and emus

Family Casuariidae
Genus Casuarius - cassowary
Genus Dromaius - emu

Cathartiformes

New World vultures

Family Cathartidae
Genus Cathartes
Genus Coragyps - black vulture
Genus Gymnogyps
Genus Sarcoramphus - king vulture
Genus Vultur - Andean condor

Charadriiformes

Plovers, crab plovers, lapwings, seagulls, puffins, auks, sandpipers, buttonquails, stilts, avocets, ibisbills, woodcocks, skuas, etc.

Family Alcidae - puffins, guillemots, murres, and allies
Genus Aethia - auklets
Genus Alca - razorbill
Genus Alle - little auk
Genus Brachyramphus - murrelets
Genus Cepphus - guillemots
Genus Cerorhinca - rhinoceros auklet
Genus Fratercula - puffins
Genus Ptychoramphus - Cassin's auklet
Genus Synthliboramphus - murrelets
Genus Uria - murres
Family Burhinidae - thick-knees
Genus Burhinus
Genus Esacus
Family Charadriidae - plovers and lapwings
Genus Anarhynchus - wrybill
Genus Charadrius
Genus Elseyornis - black-fronted dotterel
Genus Erythrogonys - red-kneed dotterel
Genus Oreopholus - tawny-throated dotterel
Genus Peltohyas - inland dotterel
Genus Phegornis - diademed sandpiper-plover
Genus Pluvialis
Genus Thinornis
Genus Vanellus
Family Chionididae - sheathbills
Genus Chionis
Family Dromadidae - crab plover
Genus Dromas
Family Glareolidae - pratincoles and coursers
Genus Cursorius
Genus Glareola
Genus Rhinoptilus
Genus Stiltia - Australian pratincole
Family Haematopodidae - oystercatchers
Genus Haematopus
Family Ibidorhynchidae - ibisbill
Genus Ibidorhyncha
Family Jacanidae - jacanas
Genus Actophilornis
Genus Hydrophasianus - pheasant-tailed jacana
Genus Irediparra - comb-crested jacana
Genus Jacana
Genus Metopidius - bronze-winged jacana
Genus Microparra - lesser jacana
Family Laridae - gulls, terns, and skimmers
Genus Anous
Genus Chlidonias - marsh tern
Genus Chroicocephalus
Genus Creagrus - swallow-tailed gull
Genus Gelochelidon - gull-billed tern
Genus Gygis - white tern
Genus Hydrocoloeus - little gull
Genus Hydroprogne - Caspian tern
Genus Ichthyaetus
Genus Larosterna - Inca tern
Genus Larus
Genus Leucophaeus
Genus Onychoprion
Genus Pagophila - ivory gull
Genus Phaetusa - large-billed tern
Genus Rhodostethia - Ross's gull
Genus Rissa - kittiwakes
Genus Rynchops - skimmers
Genus Sterna
Genus Sternula
Genus Thalasseus
Genus Xema - Sabine's gull
Family Pedionomidae - plains wanderer
Genus Pedionomus
Family Pluvianellidae - Magellanic plover
Genus Pluvianellus
Family Pluvianidae - Egyptian plover
Genus Pluvianus
Family Recurvirostridae - avocets and stilts
Genus Cladorhynchus - banded stilt
Genus Himantopus - stilts
Genus Recurvirostra - avocets
Family Rostratulidae - painted snipes
Genus Nycticryphes
Genus Rostratula
Family Scolopacidae - snipe, sandpipers, phalaropes, and allies
Genus Actitis
Genus Arenaria - turnstones
Genus Bartramia - upland sandpiper
Genus Calidris - sandpipers
Genus Coenocorypha - Austral snipes
Genus Gallinago
Genus Limnodromus - dowitchers
Genus Limosa - godwits
Genus Lymnocryptes - jack snipe
Genus Numenius - curlews
Genus Phalaropus - phalaropes
Genus Prosobonia - Polynesian sandpiper
Genus Scolopax
Genus Tringa
Genus Xenus - Terek sandpiper
Family Stercorariidae - skuas
Genus Stercorarius
Family Thinocoridae - seedsnipes
Genus Attagis
Genus Thinocorus
Family Turnicidae - buttonquails
Genus Ortyxelos
Genus Turnix

Ciconiiformes

Storks, openbills, and jabiru

Family Ciconiidae
Genus Anastomus - openbills
Genus Ciconia
Genus Ephippiorhynchus
Genus Jabiru
Genus Leptoptilos
Genus Mycteria

Coliiformes

Mousebirds

Family Coliidae
Genus Colius
Genus Urocolius

Columbiformes

Pigeons and doves

Family Columbidae
Genus Alectroenas - fruit doves
Genus Alopecoenas
Genus Caloenas - Nicobar pigeon
Genus Chalcophaps - emerald doves
Genus Claravis
Genus Columba includes Aplopelia, Old World pigeons
Genus Columbina
Genus Cryptophaps - sombre pigeon
Genus Didunculus - tooth-billed pigeon
Genus Drepanoptila - possibly better merged with Ptilinopus
Genus Ducula - imperial pigeons
Genus Dysmoropelia - Saint Helena dove
Genus Gallicolumba
Genus Geopelia
Genus Geophaps
Genus Geotrygon - quail-doves
Genus Goura
Genus Gymnophaps - mountain pigeons
Genus Hemiphaga
Genus Henicophaps
Genus Leptotila
Genus Leptotrygon - olive-backed quail-dove
Genus Leucosarcia - wonga pigeon
Genus Lopholaimus - topknot pigeon
Genus Macropygia
Genus Metriopelia
Genus Nesoenas
Genus Ocyphaps - crested pigeon
Genus Oena - Namaqua dove, tentatively placed here
Genus Otidiphaps - pheasant pigeon
Genus Patagioenas - American pigeons
Genus Petrophassa - rock pigeons
Genus Phapitreron - brown dove
Genus Phaps
Genus Ptilinopus 
Genus Reinwardtoena
Genus Starnoenas - blue-headed quail-dove
Genus Spilopelia
Genus Streptopelia - turtledoves
Genus Treron - green pigeons
Genus Trugon - thick-billed ground pigeon
Genus Turacoena
Genus Turtur - African wood doves, tentatively placed here
Genus Uropelia - long-tailed ground dove
Genus Zenaida - Zenaida doves
Genus Zentrygon

Coraciiformes

Rollers, bee eaters, todies, kingfishers, etc.

Family Alcedinidae - kingfishers
Genus Actenoides
Genus Alcedo
Genus Caridonax - glittering kingfisher
Genus Ceryle - pied kingfisher
Genus Ceyx
Genus Chloroceryle - American green kingfisher
Genus Cittura - lilac kingfisher
Genus Clytoceyx
Genus Corythornis
Genus Dacelo
Genus Halcyon
Genus Ispidina
Genus Lacedo
Genus Megaceryle
Genus Melidora - hook-billed kingfisher
Genus Pelargopsis
Genus Syma
Genus Tanysiptera - paradise kingfisher
Genus Todirhamphus
Family Brachypteraciidae - ground rollers
Genus Atelornis
Genus Brachypteracias - short-legged ground roller
Genus Geobiastes - scaly ground roller
Genus Uratelornis - long-tailed ground roller
Family Coraciidae - rollers
Genus Coracias
Genus Eurystomus
Family Meropidae - bee-eaters
Genus Meropogon - purple-bearded bee-eater
Genus Merops
Genus Nyctyornis
Family Momotidae - motmots
Genus Aspatha - blue-throated motmot
Genus Baryphthengus
Genus Electron
Genus Eumomota - turquoise-browed motmot
Genus Hylomanes - tody motmot
Genus Momotus
Family Todidae - todies
Genus Todus

Cuculiformes

Cuckoos, anis, etc.

Family Cuculidae
Genus Cacomantis
Genus Carpococcyx – Asian ground-cuckoos
Genus Centropus - coucals
Genus Cercococcyx – long-tailed cuckoos
Genus Ceuthmochares – yellowbills
Genus Chrysococcyx – bronze cuckoos
Genus Clamator
Genus Coccycua – formerly in Coccyzus and Piaya, includes Micrococcyx
Genus Coccyzus – includes Saurothera and Hyetornis
Genus Coua – coua
Genus Crotophaga – anis
Genus Cuculus – typical cuckoos
Genus Dromococcyx
Genus Eudynamys – typical koels
Genus Geococcyx – roadrunners
Genus Guira – guira cuckoo
Genus Hierococcyx – hawk-cuckoos
Genus Microdynamis – dwarf koel
Genus Morococcyx – lesser ground cuckoo
Genus Neomorphus – Neotropical ground-cuckoos
Genus Pachycoccyx – thick-billed cuckoo
Genus Phaenicophaeus – typical malkohas
Genus Piaya
Genus Rhinortha – Raffles's malkoha (sometimes in Phaenicophaeus; tentatively placed here)
Genus Scythrops – channel-billed cuckoo
Genus Surniculus – drongo-cuckoos
Genus Tapera – striped cuckoo
Genus Urodynamis – Pacific long-tailed cuckoo

Eurypygiformes

Sunbitterns and kagu

Family Eurypygidae - sunbittern
Genus Eurypyga
Family Rhynochetidae - kagu
 Genus Rhynochetos

Falconiformes

Falcons and caracara

Family Falconidae
 Genus Caracara – crested caracaras
 Genus Daptrius – black caracara
 Genus Falco – true falcons, hobbies and kestrels
 Genus Herpetotheres – laughing falcon
 Genus Ibycter – red-throated caracara (sometimes included in Daptrius)
 Genus Micrastur – forest falcons
 Genus Microhierax – typical falconets
 Genus Milvago – brown caracaras
 Genus Phalcoboenus – Andean and southern South American caracaras
 Genus Polihierax – pygmy falcons
 Genus Spiziapteryx – spot-winged falconet

Galliformes

Gamebirds

Family Cracidae
 Genus Aburria
 Genus Chamaepetes
 Genus Crax - curassows
 Genus Mitu - curassows
 Genus Nothocrax - nocturnal curassow
 Genus Oreophasis - horned guan
 Genus Ortalis - chachalacas
 Genus Papile - Piping guan
 Genus Pauxi - helmeted curassows
 Genus Penelope
 Genus Penelopina
Family Megapodiidae
 Genus Aepypodius
 Genus Alectura - Australian brushturkey
 Genus Eulipoa - Moluccan megapode
 Genus Leipoa
 Genus Macrocephalon - maleo
 Genus Megapodius - scrubfowl
 Genus Talegalla
Family Numididae
 Genus Acryllium
 Genus Agelastes
 Genus Guttera
 Genus Numida - helmeted guineafowl
Family Odontophoridae
 Genus Callipepla
 Genus Colinus
 Genus Cyrtonyx
 Genus Dactylortyx - singing quail
 Genus Dendrortyx
 Genus Odontophorus - wood quails
 Genus Oreortyx - mountain quails
 Genus Philortyx - banded quail
 Genus Ptilopachus
 Genus Rhynchortyx - tawny-faced quail
Family Phasianidae
 Genus Afropavo - Congo peafowl
 Genus Alectoris - rock partridges
 Genus Ammoperdix - see-see and sand partridge
 Genus Anurophasis - Snow Mountain quail
 Genus Arborophila - hill partridge
 Genus Argusianus - great argus
 Genus Bambusicola - bamboo partridge
 Genus Bonasa - ruffed grouse
 Genus Caloperdix - ferruginous partridge
 Genus Catreus - cheer pheasant
 Genus Centrocercus - sage grouse
 Genus Chrysolophus - ruffed pheasant
 Genus Coturnix - mouse pheasant
 Genus Crossoptilon - eared pheasant
 Genus Dendragapus
 Genus Excalfactoria
 Genus Falcipennis
 Genus Francolinus - true francolins
 Genus Galloperdix - Indian spurfowl
 Genus Gallus - junglefowl
 Genus Haematortyx - crimson-headed partridge
 Genus Ithaginis - blood pheasant
 Genus Lagopus - ptarmigans
 Genus Lerwa - snow partridge
 Genus Lophophorus - monal
 Genus Lophura - gallopheasants
 Genus Margaroperdix - Madagascan partridge
 Genus Melanoperdix - black partridge
 Genus Meleagris - turkeys
 Genus Ophrysia - Himalayan quail
 Genus Pavo - peafowl
 Genus Peliperdix
 Genus Perdicula - bush quail
 Genus Perdix - true partridges
 Genus Phasianus - typical pheasants
 Genus Polyplectron - peacock-pheasant
 Genus Pternistis - African spurfowls
 Genus Pucrasia - Koklass pheasant
 Genus Rheinardia - crested argus
 Genus Rhizothera
 Genus Rollulus - crested partridge
 Genus Scleroptila
 Genus Synoicus - see Coturnix
 Genus Syrmaticus - long-tailed pheasants
 Genus Tetrao - capercaillies and black grouse
 Genus Tetraogallus - snowcocks
 Genus Tetraophasis - monal-partridge
 Genus Tetrastes
 Genus Tragopan - horned pheasant
 Genus Tympanuchus - prairie chickens
 Genus Xenoperdix - forest partridges

GaviiformesFamily Gaviidae Genus Gavia - loons

Gruiformes

Cranes, crakes, rails, wood-rails, fluftais, gallinules, limpkin, trumpeters, and finfoots Family Aramidae - limpkin
 Genus Aramus  Family Gruidae - cranes
 Genus Antigone
 Genus Balearica
 Genus Grus - cranes
 Genus Leucogeranus - Siberian crane Family Heliornithidae - finfoots
 Genus Heliopais - masked finfoot
 Genus Heliornis - sungrebe
 Genus Podica - African finfoot Family Psophiidae Genus Psophia - trumpeters Family Rallidae - crakes, moorhens, gallinules, and rails
 Genus Aenigmatolimnas - striped crake
 Genus Amaurolimnas - uniform crake
 Genus Amaurornis - bush-hens
 Genus Anurolimnas
 Genus Aramides
 Genus Aramidopsis – snoring rail
 Genus Atlantisia - Inaccessible Island rail
 ?Genus Biensis - Madagascan rails (synonym of Rallus?)
 Genus Cabalus - Chatham rail
 Genus Coturnicops - barred-backed crake
 ?Genus Creciscus - blackish crake
 Genus Crecopsis – African crake
 Genus Crex - corn crake
 Genus Cyanolimnas – Zapata rail
 Genus Diaphorapteryx - Hawkins's rail
 Genus Dryolimnas
 Genus Eulabeornis – chestnut rail
 Genus Fulica - coots
 Genus Gallicrex - watercock
 Genus Gallinula - moorhens
 Genus Gallirallus
 Genus Gymnocrex - bare-faced rails
 Genus Habroptila – invisible rail
 Genus Hapalocrex - yellow-breasted crake
 Genus Himantornis - Nkulengu rail
 Genus Laterallus - ruddy crake
 Genus Lewinia
 ?Genus Limnocrex (synonym of Laterallus?)
 Genus Megacrex - New Guinea flightless rail
 Genus Micropygia - ocellated crake
 Genus Mundia - Ascension crake
 Genus Mustelirallus
 Genus Nesoclopeus
 Genus Paragallinula - lesser moorhen
 Genus Pardirallus
 Genus Poliolimnas - see Amaurornis
 Genus Porphyrio - swamphens
 Genus Porphyriops – spot-flanked gallinule
 Genus Porzana
 Genus Rallicula - forest rails
 Genus Rallina - chestnut rails
 Genus Rallus
 Genus Rougetius - Rouget's rail
 Genus Rufirallus - russet-crowned crake
 Genus Tribonyx - native-hens
 Genus Zapornia - see Porzana Family Sarothruridae 
 Genus Canirallus - grey-throated rail and wood rails
 Genus Sarothrura - flufftails

LeptosomiformesFamily LeptosomidaeGenus Leptosomus - cuckoo roller

MesitornithiformesFamily Mesitornithidae - mesites
 Genus Mesitornis
 Genus Monias - Subdesert mesite

Musophagiformes

Turacos and go-away-birdsFamily Musophagidae Genus Corythaeola - great blue turaco
 Genus Corythaixoides - go-away-birds
 Genus Crinifer - plantain-eaters
 Genus Musophaga
 Genus Ruwenzorornis - Rwenzori turaco
 Genus Tauraco

OpisthocomiformesFamily Opisthocomidae Genus Opisthocomus - hoatzin

Otidiformes

Bustards, floricans, etc. Family Otididae Genus Afrotis
 Genus Ardeotis
 Genus Chlamydotis
 Genus Eupodotis
 Genus Houbaropsis - Bengal florican
 Genus Lissotis
 Genus Lophotis
 Genus Neotis
 Genus Otis - great bustard
 Genus Sypheotides
 Genus Tetrax - little bustard

Passeriformes

Passerines, the "song birds".  This is the largest order of birds and contains more than half of all birds. Family Acanthisittidae Genus Acanthisitta - rifleman
 Genus Xenicus - New Zealand wrens Family Acanthizidae - scrubwrens, thornbills, and gerygones
 Genus Acanthiza – thornbill
 Genus Acanthornis – scrubtit
 Genus Aethomyias – scrubwrens
 Genus Aphelocephala – whiteface
 Genus Calamanthus – fieldwren
 Genus Crateroscelis
 Genus Gerygone
 Genus Hylacola – heathwren
 Genus Neosericornis – yellow-throated scrubwren
 Genus Oreoscopus – fernwren
 Genus Origma
 Genus Pachycare – goldenface
 Genus Pycnoptilus – pilotbird
 Genus Pyrrholaemus - speckled warbler
 Genus Sericornis – scrubwrens
 Genus Smicrornis – weebill Family Acrocephalidae - marsh- and tree-warblers, recently split from the Sylviidae
 Genus Acrocephalus
 Genus Calamonastides - papyrus yellow warbler
 Genus Chloropeta
 Genus Hippolais
 Genus Iduna
 Genus Nesillas  Family Aegithalidae - long-tailed tits or bushtits
 Genus Aegithalos
 Genus Leptopoecile
 Genus Psaltriparus - American bushtit Family Aegithinidae Genus Aegithina - iora Family Alaudidae - larks
 Genus Alaemon – hoopoe-lark
 Genus Alauda – skylark
 Genus Alaudala
 Genus Ammomanes
 Genus Ammomanopsis – Gray's lark
 Genus Calandrella – short-toed lark
 Genus Calendulauda
 Genus Certhilauda – short-clawed lark and long-billed lark
 Genus Chersomanes – spike-heeled lark
 Genus Chersophilus – Dupont's lark
 Genus Eremalauda – Dunn's lark
 Genus Eremophila – horned lark
 Genus Eremopterix – sparrow-larks
 Genus Galerida – Large-billed lark and crested lark
 Genus Heteromirafra – Rudd's lark and Archer's lark
 Genus Lullula – woodlark
 Genus Melanocorypha
 Genus Mirafra – larks and bushlarks
 Genus Pinarocorys – dusky lark and rufous-rumped lark
 Genus Ramphocoris – thick-billed lark
 Genus Spizocorys Family Artamidae - woodswallows, butcherbirds, currawongs, and Australian magpie
 Genus Artamus - woodswallows
 Genus Cracticus
 Genus Gymnorhina - Australian magpie
 Genus Melloria - black butcherbird
 Genus Peltops
 Genus Strepera - currawongs Family Atrichornithidae Genus Atrichornis - scrub-birds Family Bernieridae - Malagasy warblers, a newly assembled family
 Genus Bernieria – Madagascan warbler
 Genus Crossleyia – Madagascan yellowbrow
 Genus Cryptosylvicola – cryptic warbler
 Genus Hartertula – wedge-tailed jery
 Genus Oxylabes – white-throated oxylabes
 Genus Randia – Rand's warbler
 Genus Thamnornis – Thamnornis
 Genus Xanthomixis Family Bombycillidae Genus Bombycilla - waxwings Family Buphagidae Genus Buphagus - oxpeckers. Formerly usually included in Sturnidae. Family Calcariidae - longspurs and snow buntings
 Genus Calcarius - longspurs
 Genus Plectrophenax - snow and McKay's buntings
 Genus Rhynchophanes - thick-billed longspur Family Callaeidae - New Zealand wattlebirds
 Genus Callaeas - kokako
 Genus Heteralocha - huia
 Genus Philesturnus - saddleback Family Calyptophilidae Genus Calyptophilus - chat-tanagers Family Campephagidae - cuckooshrikes and trillers
 Genus Campephaga
 Genus Campochaera - golden cuckooshrike
 Genus Ceblepyris
 Genus Celebesica - pygmy cuckooshrike
 Genus Coracina
 Genus Cyanograucalus - blue cuckooshrike
 Genus Edolisoma
 Genus Lalage
 Genus Lobotos
 Genus Malindangia - McGregor's cuckooshrike
 Genus Pericrocotus - minivet Family Cardinalidae - cardinals and allies
 Genus Amaurospiza
 Genus Cardinalis
 Genus Caryothraustes
 Genus Chlorothraupis
 Genus Cyanocompsa
 Genus Cyanoloxia - Glaucous-blue grosbeak
 Genus Granatellus
 Genus Habia
 Genus Passerina
 Genus Periporphyrus - red-and-black grosbeak
 Genus Pheucticus
 Genus Piranga
 Genus Rhodothraupis - crimson-collared grosbeak
 Genus Spiza - dickcissel Family Certhiidae - treecreepers
 Genus Certhia
 Genus Salpornis Family Cettiidae - ground-warblers and allies, recently split from the Sylviidae
 Genus Abroscopus – abroscopus warbler
 Genus Cettia – typical bush warblers
 Genus Horornis
 Genus Hylia – green hylia (tentatively placed here)
 Genus Pholidornis – tit hylia (formerly in Remizidae; tentatively placed here)
 Genus Phyllergates
 Genus Tesia
 Genus Tickellia – broad-billed warbler
 Genus Urosphena – stubtails Family Chaetopidae Genus Chaetops - rockjumpers, recently split from the Turdidae Family Chloropseidae Genus Chloropsis - leafbirds Family Cinclidae Genus Cinclus - dippers Family Cisticolidae - cisticolas and allies
 Genus Apalis
 Genus Artisornis
 Genus Bathmocercus - rufous warblers
 Genus Calamonastes
 Genus Camaroptera
 Genus Cisticola
 Genus Drymocichla - red-winged grey warbler
 Genus Eminia - grey-capped warbler
 Genus Eremomela
 Genus Euryptila - cinnamon-breasted warbler
 Genus Heliolais – red-winged warbler (Sometimes placed in Prinia)
 Genus Hypergerus - oriole warbler
 Genus Incana - Socotra warbler
 Genus Malcorus - rufous-eared warbler
 Genus Micromacronus
 Genus Neomixis - Jerys (genus is basal to all other Cisticolidae)
 Genus Oreolais (moved here from Apalis)
 Genus Oreophilais - Roberts's warbler
 Genus Orthotomus - tailorbirds
 Genus Phragmacia - Namaqua warbler
 Genus Phyllolais - buff-bellied warbler
 Genus Poliolais - white-tailed warbler
 Genus Prinia
 Genus Scepomycter (sometimes merged into Bathmocercus)
 Genus Schistolais
 Genus Spiloptila - cricket warbler
 Genus Urolais - green longtail
 Genus Urorhipis– sometimes placed in Prinia Family Climacteridae - Australian treecreeper
 Genus Cormobates
 Genus Climacteris Family Cnemophilidae - satinbirds
 Genus Cnemophilus
 Genus Loboparadisea - yellow-breasted satinbird Family Conopophagidae - gnateaters and gnatpittas
 Genus Conopophaga
 Genus Pittasoma Family Corcoracidae - Australian mudnester
 Genus Corcorax - white-winged chough
 Genus Struthidea - apostlebird Family Corvidae - crows, ravens, and jays
 Genus Aphelocoma – scrub jays
 Genus Calocitta – Magpie-jay
 Genus Cissa - magpies
 Genus Corvus - crows and ravens
 Genus Crypsirina - treepies
 Genus Cyanocitta - jays
 Genus Cyanocorax - jays
 Genus Cyanolyca
 Genus Cyanopica - magpies
 Genus Dendrocitta - treepies
 Genus Garrulus - jays
 Genus Gymnorhinus - pinyon jay
 Genus Nucifraga - nutcrackers
 Genus Perisoreus - jays
 Genus Pica - magpies
 Genus Platylophu - Crested jay
 Genus Platysmurus - black magpie
 Genus Podoces – ground jays
 Genus Psilorhinus - brown jay
 Genus Ptilostomus - piapiac
 Genus Pyrrhocorax - chough
 Genus Temnurus - ratchet-tailed treepie
 Genus Urocissa - blue magpies
 Genus Zavattariornis - Stresemann's bushcrow Family Cotingidae - cotingas and allies
 Genus Ampelioides - scaled fruiteater
 Genus Ampelion
 Genus Carpodectes
 Genus Carpornis - berryeaters
 Genus Cephalopterus - umbrellabirds
 Genus Conioptilon - black-faced cotinga
 Genus Cotinga
 Genus Doliornis
 Genus Gymnoderus - bare-necked fruitcrow
 Genus Haematoderus - crimson fruitcrow
 Genus Lipaugus
 Genus Perissocephalus - capuchinbird
 Genus Phibalura - swallow-tailed cotinga
 Genus Phoenicircus
 Genus Phytotoma - plantcutters
 Genus Pipreola
 Genus Porphyrolaema - purple-throated cotinga
 Genus Procnias - Neotropical bellbird
 Genus Pyroderus - red-ruffed fruitcrow
 Genus Querula - purple-throated fruitcrow
 Genus Rupicola
 Genus Snowornis
 Genus Tijuca
 Genus Xipholena
 Genus Zaratornis - white-cheeked cotinga Family Dasyornithidae Genus Dasyornis - bristlebirds (formerly in Acanthizidae) Family Dicaeidae - flowerpeckers (sunbirds and flowerpeckers, might be included in Passeroidea)
 Genus Dicaeum
 Genus Prionochilus Family Dicruridae Genus Dicrurus - drongos Family Donacobiidae Genus Donacobius - black-capped donacobius (previously classed as a wren, but probably closest to the Locustellidae or Bernieridae) Family Dulidae (tentatively placed here)
 Genus Dulus- palmchat Family Elachuridae Genus Elachura - spotted elachura Family Emberizidae Genus Diglossopis
 Genus Emberiza - Old World buntings Family Erythrocercidae
 Genus Erythrocercus Family Estrildidae - estrildid finches (waxbills, munias, and allies)
 Genus Amadina - cut-throats
 Genus Amandava - avadavats
 Genus Clytospiza - brown twinspot
 Genus Coccopygia Genus Cryptospiza - crimsonwings
 Genus Emblema - painted finch
 Genus Erythrura - parrotfinches (includes Chloebia)
 Genus Estrilda - waxbills
 Genus Euodice - silverbill
 Genus Euschistospiza Genus Heteromunia - pictorella mannikin
 Genus Hypargos Genus Lagonosticta - firefinches
 Genus Lonchura - Munias, mannikins, and silverbills
 Genus Mandingoa - green-backed twinspot
 Genus Neochmia Genus Nesocharis - oliveback
 Genus Nigrita Genus Odontospiza - grey-headed silverbill
 Genus Oreostruthus - mountain firetail
 Genus Ortygospiza - quailfinches
 Genus Padda Genus Paludipasser - locust finch
 Genus Parmoptila - antpeckers
 Genus Poephila Genus Pyrenestes - seedcrackers
 Genus Pytilia Genus Spermophaga - bluebill
 Genus Stagonopleura - firetail
 Genus Taeniopygia Genus Uraeginthus Family Eulacestomidae
 Genus Eulacestoma - wattled ploughbill
 Family Eupetidae
 Genus Eupetes - Malaysian rail-babbler (recently split from the Cinclosomatidae)
 Family Eurylaimidae - broadbills
 Genus Calyptomena Genus Corydon - dusky broadbill
 Genus Cymbirhynchus - black-and-red broadbill
 Genus Eurylaimus Genus Neodrepanis Genus Philepitta Genus Psarisomus - long-tailed broadbill
 Genus Pseudocalyptomena - Grauer's broadbill
 Genus Sarcophanops Genus Serilophus - silver-breasted broadbill
 Genus Smithornis Family Formicariidae - Antthrushe
 Genus Chamaeza Genus Formicarius Family Fringillidae - true finches and Hawaiian honeycreepers. (Possibly polyphyletic)
 Genus Acanthis – redpolls
 Genus Agraphospiza – Blanford's rosefinch
 Genus Bucanetes – trumpeter finch and Mongolian finch
 Genus Callacanthis – spectacled finch
 Genus Carduelis Genus Carpodacus – rosefinches
 Genus Chloridops Genus Chloris – greenfinches
 Genus Chlorodrepanis - 'amakihis
 Genus Chlorophonia Genus Chrysocorythus – mountain serin
 Genus Coccothraustes Genus Crithagra Genus Drepanis Genus Eophona – Chinese grosbeak and Japanese grosbeak
 Genus Euphonia Genus Fringilla Genus Haemorhous – American rosefinches
 Genus Hemignathus Genus Himatione Genus Leucosticte – mountain and rosy finches
 Genus Linaria Genus Linurgus – oriole finch
 Genus Loxia – crossbills
 Genus Loxioides – palila
 Genus Loxops Genus Magumma – ʻanianiau
 Genus Melamprosops – poʻouli
 Genus Mycerobas – Palearctic grosbeaks
 Genus Oreomystis – ʻakikiki
 Genus Palmeria – ʻakohekohe
 Genus Paroreomyza Genus Pinicola – pine grosbeak
 Genus Procarduelis – dark-breasted rosefinch
 Genus Pseudonestor – Maui parrotbill
 Genus Psittirostra – ʻŌʻū
 Genus Pyrrhoplectes – golden-naped finch
 Genus Pyrrhula – bullfinches
 Genus Rhodopechys Genus Rhodospiza – desert finch
 Genus Rhynchostruthus – golden-winged grosbeak
 Genus Serinus Genus Spinus Genus Telespiza Family Furnariidae - ovenbirds and woodcreepers
 Genus Acrobatornis – pink-legged graveteiro
 Genus Anabacerthia – foliage-gleaners
 Genus Anabazenops – foliage-gleaners
 Genus Ancistrops – chestnut-winged hookbill
 Genus Anumbius – firewood-gatherer
 Genus Aphrastura – rayaditos
 Genus Asthenes – canasteros
 Genus Automolus – foliage-gleaners
 Genus Berlepschia – point-tailed palmcreeper
 Genus Campylorhamphus – scythebills
 Genus Certhiasomus – spot-throated woodcreeper (also described as Deconychura stictolaema)
 Genus Certhiaxis – spinetails
 Genus Cichlocolaptes Genus Cinclodes Genus Clibanornis Genus Coryphistera – lark-like brushrunner
 Genus Cranioleuca – typical spinetails
 Genus Deconychura – long-tailed woodcreeper
 Genus Dendrexetastes – cinnamon-throated woodcreeper
 Genus Dendrocincla – woodcreepers
 Genus Dendrocolaptes – woodcreepers
 Genus Dendroplex – straight-billed woodcreeper (formerly in Xiphorhynchus)
 Genus Drymornis – scimitar-billed woodcreeper
 Genus Drymotoxeres – greater scythebill
 Genus Furnarius – horneros
 Genus Geocerthia – striated earthcreeper (also described as Upucerthia serrana)
 Genus Geositta – miners
 Genus Glyphorynchus – wedge-billed woodcreeper
 Genus Heliobletus – sharp-billed treehunter
 Genus Hellmayrea – white-browed spinetail
 Genus Hylexetastes – woodcreepers
 Genus Lepidocolaptes – narrow-billed woodcreeper
 Genus Leptasthenura – tit-spinetails
 Genus Limnoctites – straight-billed reedhaunter (sometimes included in Limnornis, but closer to, and possibly better merged with Cranioleuca)
 Genus Limnornis – curve-billed reedhaunter
 Genus Lochmias – sharp-tailed streamcreeper
 Genus Margarornis – treerunners
 Genus Mazaria – white-bellied spinetail
 Genus Megaxenops – great xenops
 Genus Metopothrix – orange-fronted plushcrown
 Genus Microxenops – rufous-tailed xenops
 Genus Nasica – long-billed woodcreeper
 Genus Ochetorhynchus – earthcreepers (formerly included in Upucerthia) (includes Chilia)
 Genus Phacellodomus – Thornbird
 Genus Philydor – foliage-gleaners
 Genus Phleocryptes – wren-like rushbird
 Genus Premnoplex – typical barbtails
 Genus Premnornis – rusty-winged barbtail
 Genus Pseudasthenes – "false" canasteros
 Genus Pseudocolaptes – tuftedcheeks
 Genus Pseudoseisura Genus Pygarrhichas – white-throated treerunner
 Genus Roraimia - 
 Genus Schoeniophylax – Chotoy spinetail
 Genus Sclerurus – leaftossers
 Genus Siptornis – spectacled prickletail
 Genus Sittasomus – olivaceous woodcreeper
 Genus Spartonoica – bay-capped wren-spinetail
 Genus Sylviorthorhynchus – Des Murs's wiretail
 Genus Synallaxis – spinetails
 Genus Syndactyla – foliage-gleaners
 Genus Tarphonomus (new genus for 2 species formerly included in Upucerthia)
 Genus Thripadectes – treehunters
 Genus Thripophaga – softtails
 Genus Upucerthia – earthcreepers
 Genus Xenerpestes – greytails
 Genus Xenops Genus Xiphocolaptes – woodcreepers
 Genus Xiphorhynchus – woodcreepers (possibly polyphyletic)
 Family Grallariidae - antpittas
 Genus Grallaria Genus Grallaricula Genus Hylopezus Genus Myrmothera Family Hirundinidae - swallows and martins
 Genus Alopochelidon - tawny-headed swallow
 Genus Atticora Genus Cecropis Genus Cheramoeca - white-backed swallow
 Genus Delichon Genus Haplochelidon - Andean swallow
 Genus Hirundo Genus Neochelidon - white-thighed swallow
 Genus Notiochelidon Genus Petrochelidon Genus Phedina Genus Progne Genus Psalidoprocne - saw-wings
 Genus Pseudhirundo - grey-rumped swallow
 Genus Pseudochelidon - river martin
 Genus Ptyonoprogne - crag martins
 Genus Riparia Genus Stelgidopteryx Genus Tachycineta Family Hyliidae - newly proposed for genera currently in other families
 Family Hyliotidae
 Genus Hyliota - hyliotas (recently split from the Sylviidae)
 Family Hypocoliidae
 Genus Hypocolius - grey hypocolius (tentatively placed here)
 Family Icteridae - grackles, New World blackbirds, and New World orioles
 Genus Agelaioides - baywings
 Genus Agelaius – typical American blackbirds
 Genus Agelasticus Genus Amblycercus – yellow-billed cacique
 Genus Amblyramphus – scarlet-headed blackbird
 Genus Anumara - Forbes's blackbird
 Genus Cacicus – true caciques
 Genus Chrysomus Genus Curaeus - Austral blackbird
 Genus Dives Genus Dolichonyx – bobolink
 Genus Euphagus Genus Gnorimopsar – chopi blackbird
 Genus Gymnomystax – oriole blackbird
 Genus Hypopyrrhus – red-bellied grackle
 Genus Icterus – New World orioles
 Genus Lampropsar – velvet-fronted grackle
 Genus Leistes – South American meadowlarks
 Genus Macroagelaius Genus Molothrus – cowbirds
 Genus Nesopsar – Jamaican blackbird
 Genus Oreopsar – Bolivian blackbird
 Genus Psarocolius – oropendolas
 Genus Pseudoleistes – marshbirds
 Genus Quiscalus – grackles
 Genus Sturnella – North American meadowlarks
 Genus Xanthocephalus – yellow-headed blackbird
 Genus Xanthopsar - saffron-cowled blackbird
 Family Ifritidae
 Genus Ifrita - blue-capped ifrit
 Family Irenidae
 Genus Irena - fairy-bluebirds
 Family Laniidae - shrikes
 Genus Corvinella - yellow-billed shrike
 Genus Eurocephalus Genus Lanius Genus Urolestes - magpie shrike
 Family Leiothrichidae - laughingthrushes and allies
 Genus Actinodura – barwings
 Genus Argya (species previous placed in Turdoides)
 Genus Cutia Genus Garrulax – laughingthrushes
 Genus Grammatoptila - striated laughingthrush
 Genus Heterophasia - sibia
 Genus Ianthocincla – laughingthrushes (species previous placed in Garrulax)
 Genus Laniellus – crocias
 Genus Leioptila - rufous-backed sibia
 Genus Leiothrix Genus Liocichla Genus Minla - red-tailed minla
 Genus Montecincla – laughingthrushes
 Genus Pterorhinus (species previous placed in Garrulax)
 Genus Trochalopteron – laughingthrushes
 Genus Turdoides – babblers
 Family Locustellidae - grass-warbler and allies, recently split from the Sylviidae
 Genus Bradypterus – megalurid bush warblers
 Genus Catriscus – fan-tailed grassbird
 Genus Cincloramphus - buff-banded thicketbird
 Genus Elaphrornis – Sri Lanka bush warbler
 Genus Helopsaltes – grasshopper warbler
 Genus Locustella – grass warblers
 Genus Malia Genus Megalurus – striated grassbird
 Genus Poodytes Genus Robsonius – ground warblers
 Genus Schoenicola Family Machaerirhynchidae
 Genus Machaerirhynchus - boatbills
 Family Macrosphenidae - African warblers such as longbills and crombecs, a recently proposed family whose composition is still uncertain
 Genus Achaetops - rockrunner
 Genus Cryptillas – Victorin's warbler (formerly Bradypterus)
 Genus Macrosphenus – longbills
 Genus Melocichla - moustached grass warbler
 Genus Sphenoeacus - Cape grassbird
 Genus Sylvietta – crombecs
 Family Malaconotidae - puffbacks, bushshrikes, tchagras, boubous, and allies
 Genus Chlorophoneus Genus Dryoscopus Genus Laniarius Genus Malaconotus Genus Nilaus - brubru
 Genus Rhodophoneus - rosy-patched bushshrike
 Genus Tchagra Genus Telophorus Family Maluridae - fairywrens, emu-wren, and grasswrens
 Genus Amytornis – grasswrens
 Genus Chenorhamphus Genus Clytomyias – orange-crowned fairywren
 Genus Malurus Genus Sipodotus – Wallace's fairywren
 Genus Stipiturus – emu-wren
 Family Melampittidae
 Genus Megalampitta - greater melampitta
 Genus Melampitta Family Melanocharitidae - berrypeckers and longbills
 Genus Melanocharis Genus Oedistoma Genus Rhamphocharis - spotted berrypecker
 Genus Toxorhamphus Family Melanopareiidae
 Genus Melanopareia - crescentchests
 Family Meliphagidae - honeyeaters
 Genus Acanthagenys - spiny-cheeked honeyeater
 Genus Acanthorhynchus - spinebill
 Genus Anthochaera Genus Anthornis - New Zealand bellbird
 Genus Ashbyia - gibberbird
 Genus Bolemoreus Genus Caligavis Genus Certhionyx - pied honeyeater
 Genus Cissomela - banded honeyeater
 Genus Conopophila Genus Entomyzon - blue-faced honeyeater
 Genus Epthianura Genus Foulehaio - wattled honeyeater
 Genus Gavicalis Genus Gliciphila - tawny-crowned honeyeater
 Genus Glycichaera - green-backed honeyeater
 Genus Glycifohia Genus Grantiella Genus Guadalcanaria - Guadalcanal honeyeater
 Genus Gymnomyza Genus Lichenostomus Genus Lichmera Genus Macgregoria - MacGregor's honeyeater
 Genus Manorina Genus Meliarchus - makira honeyeater
 Genus Melidectes Genus Melilestes - long-billed honeyeater
 Genus Meliphaga Genus Melipotes Genus Melithreptus Genus Melitograis - white-streaked friarbird
 Genus Myza Genus Myzomela Genus Nesoptilotis Genus Oreornis - orange-cheeked honeyeater
 Genus Philemon - friarbird
 Genus Phylidonyris Genus Plectorhyncha - striped honeyeater
 Genus Prosthemadera - tui
 Genus Ptiloprora Genus Ptilotula Genus Purnella - white-fronted honeyeater
 Genus Pycnopygius Genus Ramsayornis Genus Stomiopera Genus Stresemannia - Bougainville honeyeater
 Genus Sugomel - black honeyeater
 Genus Timeliopsis Genus Trichodere - white-streaked honeyeater
 Genus Xanthotis Family Menuridae
 Genus Menura - lyrebirds
 Family Mimidae - mockingbirds and thrashers
 Genus Allenia - scaly-breasted thrasher
 Genus Cinclocerthia - tremblers
 Genus Dumetella - grey catbird
 Genus Margarops - pearly-eyed thrasher
 Genus Melanoptila - black catbird
 Genus Melanotis Genus Mimus (includes Nesomimus)
 Genus Oreoscoptes - sage thrasher
 Genus Ramphocinclus - white-breasted thrasher
 Genus Toxostoma Family Mitrospingidae
 Genus Lamprospiza - Red-billed pied tanager
 Genus Mitrospingus Genus Orthogonys - Olive-green tanager
 Family Modulatricidae - dapple-throat and allies (sometimes Arcanatoridae)
 Genus Arcanator - dapple-throat
 Genus Kakamega Genus Modulatrix - spot-throat
 Family Mohouidae
 Genus Mohoua Family Monarchidae - monarch flycatchers
 Genus Arses Genus Carterornis Genus Chasiempis - ‘elepaio
 Genus Clytorhynchus – shrikebill
 Genus Eutrichomyias – cerulean paradise flycatcher
 Genus Grallina – magpie-larks
 Genus Hypothymis Genus Mayrornis Genus Metabolus – Chuuk monarch
 Genus Monarcha Genus Myiagra – broad-billed flycatcher
 Genus Neolalage – buff-bellied monarch
 Genus Pomarea Genus Symposiachrus Genus Terpsiphone – paradise flycatcher
 Genus Trochocercus Family Motacillidae
 Genus Anthus - pipits
 Genus Dendronanthus - forest wagtail
 Genus Hemimacronyx (proposed)
 Genus Macronyx - longclaws
 Genus Motacilla - wagtails
 Genus Tmetothylacus - golden pipit
 Family Muscicapidae - Old World flycatchers and chats. (Monophyly needs confirmation)
 Genus Alethe Genus Anthipes Genus Brachypteryx – shortwings
 Genus Calliope Genus Campicoloides – buff-streaked chat
 Genus Cercotrichas – scrub robins
 Genus Chamaetylas Genus Cichladusa – palm thrush
 Genus Cinclidium – blue-fronted robin
 Genus Copsychus – magpie-robins and shamas
 Genus Cossypha – robin-chats
 Genus Cossyphicula – white-bellied robin-chat
 Genus Cyanoptila Genus Cyornis Genus Emarginata Genus Empidornis – silverbirds
 Genus Enicurus – forktails
 Genus Erithacus – European robin
 Genus Eumyias Genus Ficedula – flycatchers
 Genus Fraseria – forest flycatchers
 Genus Heinrichia – great shortwing
 Genus Heteroxenicus – Gould's shortwing
 Genus Humblotia – Humblot's flycatcher
 Genus Irania – white-throated robin
 Genus Larvivora Genus Leonardina – Bagobo babbler
 Genus Luscinia Genus Melaenornis Genus Monticola – rock thrushes
 Genus Muscicapa Genus Muscicapella – pygmy flycatcher
 Genus Myiomela Genus Myioparus – tit-flycatchers
 Genus Myophonus – whistling thrush
 Genus Myrmecocichla Genus Namibornis – Herero chat
 Genus Niltava Genus Oenanthe – wheatears
 Genus Phoenicurus – redstarts
 Genus Pinarochroa – moorland chat
 Genus Pinarornis – boulder chat
 Genus Pogonocichla – white-starred robin
 Genus Saxicola Genus Sheppardia – akalats
 Genus Sholicola Genus Stiphrornis – forest robins
 Genus Swynnertonia – Swynnerton's robin
 Genus Tarsiger Genus Thamnolaea – cliff chats
 Genus Vauriella Family Nectariniidae - sunbirds and spiderhunters
 Genus Aethopyga Genus Anabathmis (sometimes included in Nectarinia)
 Genus Anthobaphes - orange-breasted sunbird (sometimes included in Nectarinia)
 Genus Anthreptes Genus Arachnothera - spiderhunters
 Genus Chalcomitra (sometimes included in Nectarinia)
 Genus Chalcoparia - Ruby-cheeked sunbird (sometimes included in Anthreptes)
 Genus Cinnyris (sometimes included in Nectarinia)
 Genus Cyanomitra (sometimes included in Nectarinia)
 Genus Deleornis (sometimes included in Anthreptes)
 Genus Drepanorhynchus - golden-winged sunbird (sometimes included in Nectarinia)
 Genus Dreptes - giant sunbird (sometimes included in Nectarinia)
 Genus Hedydipna (sometimes included in Anthreptes)
 Genus Hypogramma - purple-naped sunbird
 Genus Leptocoma (sometimes included in Nectarinia)
 Genus Nectarinia Family Neosittidae
 Genus Daphoenositta - sittellas
 Family Nesospingidae
 Genus Nesospingus - Puerto Rican tanager
 Family Nicatoridae 
 Genus Nicator- nicators
 Family Notiomystidae
 Genus Notiomystis - stitchbirds
 Family Oreoicidae - Australo-Papuan bellbirds
 Genus Aleadryas - rufous-naped bellbird
 Genus Oreoica - crested bellbird
 Genus Ornorectes - piping bellbird
 Family Oriolidae - Old World orioles
 Genus Oriolus – orioles
 Genus Pitohui Genus Sphecotheres – figbirds Family Orthonychidae Genus Orthonyx - logrunners Family Pachycephalidae Genus Colluricincla - shrikethrushes
 Genus Coracornis
 Genus Falcunculus – crested shriketit
 Genus Melanorectes – black pitohui
 Genus Pachycephala – whistlers
 Genus Pseudorectes Family Panuridae Genus Panurus - bearded reedling (formerly classed as a parrotbill) Family Paradisaeidae - birds-of-paradise
 Genus Astrapia
 Genus Cicinnurus - king bird-of-paradise
 Genus Diphyllodes
 Genus Drepanornis
 Genus Epimachus
 Genus Lophorina
 Genus Lycocorax - paradise-crow
 Genus Manucodia - manucodes
 Genus Paradigalla
 Genus Paradisaea
 Genus Parotia
 Genus Phonygammus - trumpet manucode
 Genus Pteridophora - King of Saxony bird-of-paradise
 Genus Ptiloris
 Genus Seleucidis - twelve-wired bird-of-paradise
 Genus Semioptera - standardwings Family Paramythiidae - painted berrypeckers
 Genus Oreocharis - tit berrypecker
 Genus Paramythia - crested berrypecker Family Pardalotidae Genus Pardalotus - pardalotes Family Paridae - Tits, chickadees, and titmice
 Genus Baeolophus
 Genus Cephalopyrus - fire-capped tit
 Genus Cyanistes
 Genus Lophophanes
 Genus Machlolophus
 Genus Melaniparus
 Genus Melanochlora - sultan tit
 Genus Pardaliparus
 Genus Parus
 Genus Periparus
 Genus Poecile
 Genus Pseudopodoces - ground tit
 Genus Sittiparus
 Genus Sylviparus - yellow-browed tit Family Parulidae - New World warblers
 Genus Basileuterus
 Genus Cardellina
 Genus Catharopeza - whistling warbler
 Genus Ergaticus
 Genus Geothlypis - yellowthroats
 Genus Helmitheros - worm-eating warbler
 Genus Leucopeza - Semper's warbler
 Genus Limnothlypis - Swainson's warbler
 Genus Mniotilta - black-and-white warbler
 Genus Myioborus - whitestarts
 Genus Myiothlypis
 Genus Oporornis - Connecticut warbler
 Genus Oreothlypis
 Genus Parkesia - waterthrushes
 Genus Parula
 Genus Protonotaria - prothonotary warbler
 Genus Seiurus - ovenbird
 Genus Setophaga
 Genus Vermivora Family Passerellidae - New World sparrows
 Genus Aimophila
 Genus Ammodramus
 Genus Amphispiza
 Genus Arremon
 Genus Arremonops
 Genus Artemisiospiza
 Genus Atlapetes
 Genus Calamospiza - lark bunting
 Genus Chlorospingus (traditionally placed in the tanager family Thraupidae)
 Genus Chondestes - lark sparrow
 Genus Junco
 Genus Melospiza
 Genus Melozone
 Genus Oreothraupis - tanager finch
 Genus Oriturus - striped sparrow
 Genus Passerculus
 Genus Passerella - fox sparrow
 Genus Peucaea
 Genus Pezopetes - large-footed finch
 Genus Pipilo - Towhee
 Genus Pooecetes - vesper sparrow
 Genus Pselliophorus
 Genus Spizella
 Genus Spizelloides - American tree sparrow
 Genus Torreornis - Zapata sparrow
 Genus Xenospiza - Sierra Madre sparrow
 Genus Zonotrichia Family Passeridae - Old World sparrows
 Genus Carpospiza - pale rockfinch
 Genus Gymnoris
 Genus Hypocryptadius - cinnamon ibon
 Genus Montifringilla
 Genus Onychostruthus - white-rumped snowfinch
 Genus Passer
 Genus Petronia - rock sparrows
 Genus Pyrgilauda Family Pellorneidae - jungle babblers
 Genus Alcippe
 Genus Gampsorhynchus
 Genus Graminicola
 Genus Illadopsis
 Genus Jabouilleia
 Genus Kenopia - striped wren-babbler
 Genus Laticilla
 Genus Malacocincla
 Genus Malacopteron
 Genus Napothera
 Genus Pellorneum
 Genus Ptilocichla
 Genus Ptyrticus - spotted thrush-babbler
 Genus Rimator
 Genus Trichastoma Family Petroicidae - Australasian robins
 Genus Amalocichla
 Genus Drymodes
 Genus Eopsaltria
 Genus Eugerygone - garnet robin
 Genus Heteromyias
 Genus Melanodryas
 Genus Microeca
 Genus Monachella - torrent flyrobin
 Genus Pachycephalopsis
 Genus Peneoenanthe - mangrove robin
 Genus Peneothello
 Genus Petroica
 Genus Poecilodryas
 Genus Tregellasia Family Peucedramidae Genus Peucedramus - olive warbler Family Phaenicophilidae Genus Microligea - Green-tailed warbler
 Genus Phaenicophilus
 Genus Xenoligea - White-winged warbler Family Philepittidae - asities
 Genus Neodrepanis
 Genus Philepitta Family Phylloscopidae - leaf-warblers and allies (recently split from the Sylviidae)
 Genus Phylloscopus - leaf warblers
 Genus Seicercus Family Picathartidae Genus Picathartes - rockfowl Family Pipridae - manakins
 Genus Antilophia
 Genus Ceratopipra
 Genus Chiroxiphia
 Genus Chloropipo
 Genus Corapipo
 Genus Cryptopipo - green manakin
 Genus Heterocercus
 Genus Ilicura - pin-tailed manakin
 Genus Lepidothrix
 Genus Machaeropterus
 Genus Manacus
 Genus Masius - golden-winged manakin
 Genus Neopelma
 Genus Pipra
 Genus Pseudopipra - white-crowned manakin
 Genus Tyranneutes
 Genus Xenopipo Family Pittidae - pittas
 Genus Erythropitta
 Genus Hydrornis
 Genus Pitta Family Pityriaseidae Genus Pityriasis - Bornean bristlehead (tentatively placed here) Family Platysteiridae - wattle-eyes and relatives (formerly in Passerida, probably paraphyletic)
 Genus Batis
 Genus Lanioturdus - white-tailed shrike
 Genus Platysteira Family Ploceidae - weavers
 Genus Amblyospiza – thick-billed weaver
 Genus Anaplectes – red-headed weaver
 Genus Brachycope – bob-tailed weaver
 Genus Bubalornis
 Genus Dinemellia – white-headed buffalo weaver
 Genus Euplectes – bishops and widowbirds
 Genus Foudia – fody
 Genus Histurgops – rufous-tailed weaver
 Genus Malimbus
 Genus Philetairus – sociable weaver
 Genus Plocepasser – sparrow-weavers
 Genus Ploceus
 Genus Pseudonigrita
 Genus Quelea
 Genus Sporopipes Family Pnoepygidae Genus Pnoepyga - pygmy wren-babbler Family Polioptilidae - gnatcatchers
 Genus Microbates
 Genus Ramphocaenus
 Genus Polioptila Family Pomatostomidae - Australo-Papuan babblers
 Genus Pomatostomus Family Prionopidae - see Vangidae Family Promeropidae Genus Promerops - sugarbirds Family Prunellidae Genus Prunella - accentors Family Psophodidae Genus Androphobus - Papuan whipbird
 Genus Cinclosoma – quail-thrushes
 Genus Psophodes
 Genus Ptilorrhoa – jewel-babblers Family Ptiliogonatidae - silky flycatchers (tentatively placed here)
 Genus Phainopepla
 Genus Phainoptila - black-and-yellow phainoptila
 Genus Ptilogonys Family Ptilonorhynchidae - bowerbirds
 Genus Ailuroedus
 Genus Amblyornis
 Genus Archboldia
 Genus Chlamydera
 Genus Prionodura - golden bowerbird
 Genus Ptilonorhynchus - satin bowerbird
 Genus Scenopooetes - tooth-billed bowerbird
 Genus Sericulus Family Pycnonotidae - bulbuls
 Genus Acritillas – yellow-browed bulbul
 Genus Alophoixus
 Genus Andropadus – sombre greenbul
 Genus Arizelocichla
 Genus Atimastillas – yellow-throated leaflove
 Genus Baeopogon
 Genus Bleda – bristlebills
 Genus Calyptocichla – golden greenbul
 Genus Cerasophila – white-headed bulbul
 Genus Chlorocichla
 Genus Criniger
 Genus Eurillas
 Genus Hemixos
 Genus Hypsipetes
 Genus Iole
 Genus Ixonotus – spotted greenbul
 Genus Ixos
 Genus Neolestes – black-collared bulbul
 Genus Nok – bare-faced bulbul
 Genus Phyllastrephus
 Genus Pycnonotus
 Genus Setornis – hook-billed bulbul
 Genus Spizixos – finchbills
 Genus Stelgidillas – slender-billed greenbul
 Genus Thapsinillas - golden bulbul
 Genus Thescelocichla – swamp palm bulbul
 Genus Tricholestes – hairy-backed bulbul Family Regulidae Genus Regulus - kinglets Family Remizidae - penduline tits (sometimes included in the Paridae)
 Genus Anthoscopus
 Genus Auriparus - verdin
 Genus Remiz Family Rhagologidae Genus Rhagologus - mottled berryhunter Family Rhinocryptidae - tapaculos
 Genus Acropternis - ocellated tapaculo
 Genus Eleoscytalopus
 Genus Eugralla - ochre-flanked tapaculo
 Genus Liosceles - rusty-belted tapaculo
 Genus Merulaxis
 Genus Myornis - ash-colored tapaculo
 Genus Psilorhamphus - spotted bamboowren
 Genus Pteroptochos
 Genus Rhinocrypta - crested gallito
 Genus Scelorchilus
 Genus Scytalopus
 Genus Teledromas - sandy gallito Family Rhipiduridae - fantails
 Genus Chaetorhynchus – drongo fantail
 Genus Lamprolia – silktail
 Genus Rhipidura – fantails Family Rhodinocichlidae Genus Rhodinocichla - Rosy thrush-tanager Family Salpornithidae Genus Salpornis - spotted creepers (Tentatively placed here; often considered a subfamily of the Certhidae) Family Sapayoidae Genus Sapayoa - broad-billed sapayoa Family Scotocercidae Genus Scotocerca - streaked scrub warbler Family Sittidae Family Spindalidae Genus Spindalis
 Genus Sitta - nuthatches Family Stenostiridae Genus Chelidorhynx - yellow-bellied fantail - (formerly in Rhipidura) 
 Genus Culicicapa - canary-flycatcher
 Genus Elminia
 Genus Stenostira – fairy flycatcher Family Sturnidae - starlings
 Genus Acridotheres
 Genus Agropsar (sometimes included in Sturnus or Sturnia)
 Genus Ampeliceps — golden-crested myna
 Genus Aplonis— Pacific starlings
 Genus Basilornis
 Genus Cinnyricinclus — violet-backed starling
 Genus Creatophora — wattled starling
 Genus Enodes — fiery-browed starling
 Genus Gracula — hill myna
 Genus Gracupica
 Genus Grafisia — white-collared starling
 Genus Hartlaubius - Madagascan starling
 Genus Hylopsar
 Genus Lamprotornis (monophyly requires confirmation)
 Genus Leucopsar — Bali myna
 Genus Mino
 Genus Neocichla — babbling starling
 Genus Notopholia - black-bellied starling
 Genus Onychognathus
 Genus Poeoptera (formerly Pholia, sometimes included in Cinnyricinclus)
 Genus Rhabdornis — Philippine creeper (placement here requires confirmation)
 Genus Pastor — rosy starling
 Genus Sarcops — Coleto
 Genus Saroglossa - spot-winged starling
 Genus Scissirostrum — grosbeak starling
 Genus Speculipastor — magpie starling
 Genus Spodiopsar
 Genus Spreo
 Genus Streptocitta
 Genus Sturnia (sometimes included in Sturnus)
 Genus Sturnornis — white-faced starling
 Genus Sturnus Family Sylviidae - sylviid warblers and allies
 Genus Chamaea – wrentit
 Genus Chleuasicus – pale-billed parrotbill (Formerly in Paradoxornithidae)
 Genus Cholornis (Formerly in Paradoxornithidae)
 Genus Chrysomma (Formerly in Timaliidae)
 Genus Conostoma – great parrotbill (Formerly in Paradoxornithidae; tentatively placed here)
 Genus Fulvetta (Formerly in Alcippe )
 Genus Graueria - Grauer's warbler
 Genus Horizorhinus – Dohrn's thrush-babbler (Formerly in Timaliidae)
 Genus Lioparus – golden-breasted fulvetta (Formerly in Alcippe)
 Genus Lioptilus – bush blackcap (Formerly in Timaliidae)
 Genus Moupinia - rufous-tailed babbler (Formerly in Chrysomma)
 Genus Myzornis - fire-tailed myzornis
 Genus Neosuthora – short-tailed parrotbill (Formerly in Paradoxornithidae)
 Genus Paradoxornis (Formerly in Paradoxornithidae)
 Genus Parophasma - Abyssinian catbird
 Genus Pseudoalcippe (Formerly in Illadopsis)
 Genus Psittiparus (Formerly in Paradoxornithidae)
 Genus Rhopophilus (Formerly in Cisticolidae)
 Genus Sinosuthora (Formerly in Paradoxornithidae)
 Genus Suthora (Formerly in Paradoxornithidae)
 Genus Sylvia – typical warblers Family Teretistridae Genus Teretistris - Cuban warbler Family Thamnophilidae - antbirds
 Genus Akletos
 Genus Ammonastes - grey-bellied antbird
 Genus Ampelornis - grey-headed antbird
 Genus Aprositornis - Yapacana antbird
 Genus Batara - giant antshrike
 Genus Biatas - white-bearded antshrike (Placement here is provisional)
 Genus Cercomacra
 Genus Cercomacroides
 Genus Clytoctantes - bushbirds (Placement here is provisional)
 Genus Cymbilaimus - fasciated and bamboo antshrikes
 Genus Dichrozona - banded antbird
 Genus Drymophila
 Genus Dysithamnus - antvireos
 Genus Epinecrophylla
 Genus Euchrepomis
 Genus Formicivora
 Genus Frederickena - antshrikes
 Genus Gymnocichla - bare-crowned antbird
 Genus Gymnopithys
 Genus Hafferia
 Genus Herpsilochmus
 Genus Hylophylax
 Genus Hypocnemis - warbling antbirds
 Genus Hypocnemoides
 Genus Hypoedaleus - spot-backed antshrike
 Genus Isleria - antwrens
 Genus Mackenziaena - antshrikes
 Genus Megastictus - pearly antshrike
 Genus Microrhopias - dot-winged antwren
 Genus Myrmeciza - white-bellied antbird
 Genus Myrmelastes
 Genus Myrmoborus
 Genus Myrmochanes - black-and-white antbird
 Genus Myrmoderus
 Genus Myrmophylax - black-throated antbird
 Genus Myrmorchilus - stripe-backed antbird
 Genus Myrmornis - wing-banded antbird
 Genus Myrmotherula - antwrens
 Genus Neoctantes - black bushbird
 Genus Oneillornis
 Genus Percnostola
 Genus Phaenostictus - ocellated antbird
 Genus Phlegopsis - bare-eyes
 Genus Pithys
 Genus Poliocrania - chestnut-backed antbird
 Genus Pygiptila - spot-winged antshrike
 Genus Pyriglena - fire-eyes
 Genus Rhegmatorhina
 Genus Rhopias - star-throated antwren
 Genus Rhopornis - slender antbird (Placement here is provisional)
 Genus Sakesphorus - antshrikes
 Genus Sciaphylax
 Genus Sclateria - silvered antbird
 Genus Sipia
 Genus Stymphalornis - marsh antwren
 Genus Taraba - great antshrike
 Genus Terenura
 Genus Thamnistes
 Genus Thamnomanes
 Genus Thamnophilus
 Genus Willisornis
 Genus Xenornis - speckled antshrike (Placement here is provisional) Family Thraupidae - tanagers and allies
 Genus Acanthidops – peg-billed finch
 Genus Anisognathus
 Genus Bangsia
 Genus Buthraupis
 Genus Calochaetes – vermilion tanager
 Genus Camarhynchus – tree finches
 Genus Catamblyrhynchus – plushcap
 Genus Catamenia
 Genus Certhidea – warbler-finches
 Genus Charitospiza – coal-crested finch
 Genus Chlorochrysa
 Genus Chlorophanes – green honeycreeper
 Genus Chlorornis – grass-green tanager
 Genus Chrysothlypis
 Genus Cissopis – magpie tanager
 Genus Cnemathraupis
 Genus Cnemoscopus – grey-hooded bush tanager
 Genus Coereba – bananaquit (formerly placed in its own family Coerebidae)
 Genus Compsospiza – mountain finches
 Genus Compsothraupis – scarlet-throated tanager
 Genus Conirostrum
 Genus Conothraupis
 Genus Coryphaspiza – black-masked finch
 Genus Coryphospingus
 Genus Creurgops
 Genus Cyanerpes - honeycreepers
 Genus Cyanicterus – blue-backed tanager
 Genus Cypsnagra – white-rumped tanager
 Genus Dacnis
 Genus Diglossa – flowerpiercers
 Genus Diuca
 Genus Dolospingus – white-naped seedeater
 Genus Donacospiza – long-tailed reed finch (may be related to Poospiza)
 Genus Dubusia
 Genus Emberizoides
 Genus Embernagra
 Genus Eucometis – grey-headed tanager
 Genus Euneornis – orangequit
 Genus Geospiza – ground finches
 Genus Gubernatrix – yellow cardinal
 Genus Haplospiza (paraphyletic with two species of sierra-finch Phrygilus)
 Genus Hemispingus
 Genus Hemithraupis
 Genus Heterospingus
 Genus Idiopsar – short-tailed finch
 Genus Incaspiza - Inca finches
 Genus Iridophanes – golden-collared honeycreeper
 Genus Iridosornis
 Genus Lanio
 Genus Lophospingus
 Genus Loxigilla (polyphyletic)
 Genus Loxipasser – yellow-shouldered grassquit
 Genus Melanodera
 Genus Melanospiza – Saint Lucia black finch
 Genus Melopyrrha
 Genus Nemosia
 Genus Neothraupis – shrike-like tanager
 Genus Nephelornis – pardusco
 Genus Nesospiza
 Genus Orchesticus – brown tanager
 Genus Oreomanes – giant conebill
 Genus Oryzoborus
 Genus Parkerthraustes – yellow-shouldered grosbeak (traditionally in Cardinalidae)
 Genus Paroaria
 Genus Phrygilus – sierra finches
 Genus Piezorina – cinereous finch
 Genus Pinaroloxias – Cocos finch
 Genus Pipraeidea - fawn-breasted tanager
 Genus Platyspiza - vegetarian finch
 Genus Poospiza – warbling finches
 Genus Porphyrospiza - blue finch
 Genus Pseudosaltator - rufous-bellied mountain tanager
 Genus Pyrrhocoma – chestnut-headed tanager
 Genus Ramphocelus
 Genus Rhodospingus – crimson-breasted finch
 Genus Rowettia – Gough finch
 Genus Saltator
 Genus Saltatricula – many-colored Chaco finch
 Genus Schistochlamys
 Genus Sericossypha – white-capped tanager
 Genus Sicalis – yellow finches (paraphyletic with Phrygilus)
 Genus Sporophila – seedeaters
 Genus Stephanophorus – diademed tanager
 Genus Tachyphonus
 Genus Tangara
 Genus Tersina – swallow tanager
 Genus Thlypopsis
 Genus Thraupis
 Genus Tiaris – grassquits (polyphyletic)
 Genus Trichothraupis – black-goggled tanager
 Genus Urothraupis – black-backed bush tanager
 Genus Volatinia – blue-black grassquit
 Genus Wetmorethraupis – orange-throated tanager
 Genus Xenodacnis – tit-like dacnis
 Genus Xenospingus – slender-billed finch Family Tichodromadidae Genus Tichodroma - wallcreeper Family Timaliidae - Old World babblers
 Genus Dumetia - tawny-bellied babbler
 Genus Macronus – tit-babblers
 Genus Pomatorhinus – scimitar babblers
 Genus Rhopocichla - dark-fronted babbler
 Genus Spelaeornis – wren-babblers
 Genus Sphenocichla – wedge-billed babblers
 Genus Stachyridopsis
 Genus Stachyris
 Genus Timalia - chestnut-capped babbler Family Tityridae - tityras and allies
 Genus Iodopleura - purpletuft
 Genus Laniisoma
 Genus Laniocera
 Genus Myiobius
 Genus Onychorhynchus - royal flycatchers
 Genus Oxyruncus - sharpbill
 Genus Pachyramphus - becards
 Genus Schiffornis
 Genus Terenotriccus - ruddy-tailed flycatcher
 Genus Tityra
 Genus Xenopsaris - white-naped xenopsaris Family Troglodytidae - wrens
 Genus Campylorhynchus
 Genus Cantorchilus (formerly included in Thryothorus)
 Genus Catherpes - canyon wren
 Genus Cinnycerthia
 Genus Cistothorus
 Genus Cyphorhinus
 Genus Ferminia - Zapata wren
 Genus Henicorhina - wood wrens
 Genus Hylorchilus
 Genus Microcerculus
 Genus Odontorchilus
 Genus Pheugopedius (formerly included in Thryothorus)
 Genus Salpinctes - rock wren
 Genus Thryomanes - Bewick's wren
 Genus Thryophilus (formerly included in Thryothorus)
 Genus Thryorchilus - timberline wren
 Genus Thryothorus - Carolina wren
 Genus Troglodytes
 Genus Uropsila - white-bellied wren Family Turdidae - thrushes and allies (Monophyly needs confirmation)
 Genus Cataponera - Sulawesi thrush
 Genus Catharus
 Genus Chlamydochaera - fruithunter
 Genus Cichlopsis - rufous-brown solitaire
 Genus Cochoa
 Genus Entomodestes - solitaires
 Genus Geokichla
 Genus Grandala
 Genus Hylocichla - wood thrush
 Genus Ixoreus - varied thrush
 Genus Myadestes (includes formerly recognized genus Phaeornis)
 Genus Neocossyphus - ant thrushes
 Genus Platycichla
 Genus Psophocichla - groundscraper thrush
 Genus Ridgwayia - Aztec thrush
 Genus Sialia - bluebirds
 Genus Stizorhina - rufous thrush
 Genus Turdus - true thrushes
 Genus Zoothera - Asian thrush Family Tyrannidae - tyrant flycatchers
 Genus Agriornis – shrike-tyrants
 Genus Alectrurus
 Genus Anairetes
 Genus Aphanotriccus
 Genus Arundinicola – white-headed marsh tyrant
 Genus Atalotriccus – pale-eyed pygmy tyrant
 Genus Attila
 Genus Calyptura – kinglet calyptura
 Genus Camptostoma
 Genus Capsiempis – yellow tyrannulet
 Genus Casiornis
 Genus Cnemarchus – red-rumped bush tyrant
 Genus Cnemotriccus – fuscous flycatcher
 Genus Cnipodectes - twistwings
 Genus Colonia – long-tailed tyrant
 Genus Colorhamphus – Patagonian tyrant
 Genus Conopias
 Genus Contopus – pewees
 Genus Corythopis – antpipits
 Genus Culicivora – sharp-tailed grass tyrant
 Genus Deltarhynchus – flammulated flycatcher
 Genus Elaenia
 Genus Empidonax
 Genus Empidonomus – variegated flycatcher
 Genus Euscarthmus
 Genus Fluvicola
 Genus Griseotyrannus – crowned slaty flycatcher (formerly in Empidonomus)
 Genus Gubernetes – streamer-tailed tyrant
 Genus Hemitriccus – typical tody-tyrants
 Genus Heteroxolmis – black-and-white monjita
 Genus Hirundinea – cliff flycatcher
 Genus Hymenops – spectacled tyrant
 Genus Inezia
 Genus Knipolegus – black tyrants
 Genus Lathrotriccus
 Genus Legatus – piratic flycatcher
 Genus Leptopogon
 Genus Lessonia - negritos
 Genus Lophotriccus
 Genus Machetornis – cattle tyrant
 Genus Mecocerculus
 Genus Megarynchus – boat-billed flycatcher
 Genus Mionectes
 Genus Mitrephanes
 Genus Muscigralla – short-tailed field tyrant
 Genus Muscipipra – shear-tailed grey tyrant
 Genus Muscisaxicola – ground tyrants
 Genus Myiarchus
 Genus Myiodynastes
 Genus Myiopagis
 Genus Myiophobus
 Genus Myiornis
 Genus Myiotheretes
 Genus Myiotriccus – ornate flycatcher
 Genus Myiozetetes
 Genus Neopipo – cinnamon neopipo
 Genus Neoxolmis – chocolate-vented tyrant
 Genus Nephelomyias
 Genus Nesotriccus – Cocos flycatcher
 Genus Ochthoeca
 Genus Ochthornis – drab water tyrant
 Genus Oncostoma - bentbills
 Genus Ornithion
 Genus Phaeomyias – mouse-colored tyrannulet
 Genus Phelpsia – white-bearded flycatcher
 Genus Philohydor – lesser kiskadee
 Genus Phyllomyias
 Genus Phylloscartes
 Genus Piprites
 Genus Pitangus – great kiskadee
 Genus Platyrinchus – spadebills
 Genus Poecilotriccus
 Genus Pogonotriccus
 Genus Polioxolmis – rufous-webbed bush tyrant
 Genus Polystictus
 Genus Pseudelaenia – grey-and-white tyrannulet
 Genus Pseudocolopteryx
 Genus Pseudotriccus
 Genus Pyrocephalus
 Genus Pyrrhomyias – cinnamon flycatcher
 Genus Ramphotrigon
 Genus Rhynchocyclus
 Genus Rhytipterna
 Genus Satrapa – yellow-browed tyrant
 Genus Sayornis – phoebes
 Genus Serpophaga
 Genus Silvicultrix
 Genus Sirystes
 Genus Stigmatura - wagtail-tyrants
 Genus Sublegatus
 Genus Suiriri
 Genus Tachuris – many-colored rush tyrant
 Genus Taeniotriccus – black-chested tyrant
 Genus Todirostrum – typical tody-flycatchers
 Genus Tolmomyias
 Genus Tumbezia – Tumbes tyrant
 Genus Tyrannopsis – sulphury flycatcher
 Genus Tyrannulus – yellow-crowned tyrannulet
 Genus Tyrannus – kingbirds
 Genus Uromyias
 Genus Xenotriccus
 Genus Xolmis
 Genus Zimmerius Family Urocynchramidae Genus Urocynchramus - Przewalski's finch Family Vangidae - vangas, helmetshrikes, and allies
 Genus Artamella - white-headed vanga
 Genus Bias - black-and-white shrike-flycatcher
 Genus Calicalicus
 Genus Cyanolanius - blue vanga
 Genus Euryceros - helmet vanga
 Genus Falculea - sickle-billed vanga
 Genus Hemipus - flycatcher-shrikes
 Genus Hypositta - nuthatch vanga
 Genus Leptopterus - chabert vanga
 Genus Megabyas - African shrike-flycatcher
 Genus Mystacornis - Crossley's vanga
 Genus Newtonia
 Genus Oriolia - Bernier's vanga
 Genus Philentoma
 Genus Prionops - helmetshrikes
 Genus Pseudobias - Ward's flycatcher
 Genus Schetba - rufous vanga
 Genus Tephrodornis
 Genus Tylas - tylas vanga
 Genus Vanga - hook-billed vanga
 Genus Xenopirostris Family Viduidae Genus Anomalospiza - cuckoo-finch
 Genus Vidua Family Vireonidae - vireos and allies
 Genus Cyclarhis - peppershrikes
 Genus Erpornis - white-bellied erpornis
 Genus Hylophilus
 Genus Pteruthius - shrike-babblers
 Genus Vireo - vireos
 Genus Vireolanius Family Zeledoniidae Genus Zeledonia Family Zosteropidae - white-eyes
 Genus Apalopteron – Bonin white-eye
 Genus Cleptornis – golden white-eye
 Genus Dasycrotapha
 Genus Heleia
 Genus Lophozosterops
 Genus Megazosterops – giant white-eye
 Genus Oculocincta – pygmy white-eye
 Genus Rukia
 Genus Sterrhoptilus
 Genus Tephrozosterops – rufescent darkeye
 Genus Woodfordia
 Genus Yuhina
 Genus Zosterops - Mountain blackeye
 Genus Zosterornis Family Uncertain (This has traditionally been considered a member of the family Pachycephalidae, but recent genetic evidence suggests it should be placed in a monotypic subfamily of the family Bombycillidae, or even its own family, Hylocitreidae)
 Genus Hylocitrea

Pelecaniformes

Pelicans, ibises, shoebills, egrets, herons, etc. Family Ardeidae - herons, egrets, and bitterns
 Genus Agamia – agami heron
 Genus Ardea
 Genus Ardeola – pond herons
 Genus Botaurus
 Genus Bubulcus – cattle egret (sometimes included in Ardea)
 Genus Butorides – green-backed herons (sometimes included in Ardea)
 Genus Cochlearius – boat-billed heron
 Genus Egretta
 Genus Gorsachius
 Genus Ixobrychus
 Genus Nyctanassa – American night herons
 Genus Nycticorax (sometimes includes Nyctanassa)
 Genus Pilherodius – capped heron
 Genus Syrigma – whistling heron
 Genus Tigriornis – white-crested tiger heron
 Genus Tigrisoma
 Genus Zebrilus – zigzag heron
 Genus Zonerodius – forest bittern Family Balaenicipitidae Genus Balaeniceps - shoebill Family Pelecanidae Genus Pelecanus - pelicans Family Scopidae Genus Scopus - hamerkop (sometimes included in Balaenicipitidae) Family Threskiornithidae - ibises and spoonbills
 Genus Bostrychia
 Genus Cercibis - sharp-tailed ibis
 Genus Eudocimus
 Genus Geronticus
 Genus Lophotibis - Madagascan ibis
 Genus Mesembrinibis - green ibis
 Genus Nipponia - crested ibis
 Genus Phimosus - bare-faced ibis
 Genus Platalea - spoonbills
 Genus Plegadis
 Genus Pseudibis
 Genus Thaumatibis - giant ibis
 Genus Theristicus
 Genus Threskiornis

Phaethontiformes

 Family Phaethontidae Genus Phaethon - tropicbirds

Phoenicopteriformes Family Phoenicopteridae - flamingos
 Genus Phoeniconaias - lesser flamingo
 Genus Phoenicoparrus
 Genus Phoenicopterus

Piciformes

Woodpickers, flickers, toucans, aracaris, motmots, etc. Family Bucconidae – puffbirds, nunbirds, and nunlets
 Genus Bucco
 Genus Chelidoptera - swallow-winged puffbird
 Genus Hapaloptila - white-faced nunbird
 Genus Hypnelus
 Genus Malacoptila
 Genus Micromonacha - lanceolated monklet
 Genus Monasa
 Genus Nonnula
 Genus Notharchus
 Genus Nystalus Family Capitonidae – American barbets
 Genus Capito
 Genus Eubucco Family Galbulidae – jacamars
 Genus Brachygalba
 Genus Galbalcyrhynchus
 Genus Galbula
 Genus Jacamaralcyon - three-toed jacamar
 Genus Jacamerops - great jacamar Family Indicatoridae – honeyguides
 Genus Indicator
 Genus Melichneutes - lyre-tailed honeyguide
 Genus Melignomon
 Genus Prodotiscus - honeybirds Family Lybiidae – African barbets (recently split from Capitonidae)
 Genus Buccanodon - yellow-spotted barbet
 Genus Gymnobucco
 Genus Lybius
 Genus Pogoniulus - tinkerbirds
 Genus Stactolaema
 Genus Trachyphonus
 Genus Tricholaema Family Megalaimidae – Asian barbets (recently split from Capitonidae)
 Genus Caloramphus
 Genus Psilopogon Family Picidae – woodpeckers, piculets, and wrynecks
 Genus Blythipicus
 Genus Campephilus
 Genus Campethera
 Genus Celeus
 Genus Chloropicus
 Genus Chrysocolaptes – flamebacks
 Genus Chrysophlegma
 Genus Colaptes – flickers
 Genus Dendrocopos
 Genus Dendrocoptes
 Genus Dendropicos
 Genus Dinopium – flamebacks
 Genus Dryobates
 Genus Dryocopus
 Genus Gecinulus (placement in Megapicini tentative)
 Genus Geocolaptes – ground woodpeckers
 Genus Hemicircus
 Genus Jynx - wrynecks
 Genus Leiopicus – yellow-crowned woodpecker
 Genus Leuconotopicus
 Genus Meiglyptes
 Genus Melanerpes
 Genus Micropternus – rufous woodpecker (formerly in Celeus)
 Genus Mulleripicus
 Genus Nesoctites – Antillean piculet
 Genus Picoides
 Genus Piculus
 Genus Picumnus – American piculets
 Genus Picus
 Genus Reinwardtipicus - Orange-backed woodpecker
 Genus Sasia – Asian piculets
 Genus Sphyrapicus – sapsuckers
 Genus Veniliornis
 Genus Xiphidiopicus – Cuban green woodpecker (Placement in Dendropicini tentative)
 Genus Yungipicus Family Ramphastidae – toucans
 Genus Andigena - mountain toucans
 Genus Aulacorhynchus - green toucanet
 Genus Pteroglossus - aracaris
 Genus Ramphastos
 Genus Selenidera Family Semnornithidae – toucan-barbets (recently split from Capitonidae)
 Genus Semnornis

Podicipediformes Family Podicipedidae - grebes
 Genus Aechmophorus
 Genus Podicephorus - great grebe
 Genus Podiceps
 Genus Podilymbus
 Genus Poliocephalus
 Genus Rollandia
 Genus Tachybaptus

Procellariiformes

Petrels, storm petrels, albatrosses, and diving petrels Family Diomedeidae - albatrosses
 Genus Diomedea - great albatrosses
 Genus Phoebastria - North Pacific albatrosses
 Genus Phoebetria
 Genus Thalassarche - "mollymawks" Family Hydrobatidae - northern storm petrels
 Genus Hydrobates - European storm petrel
 Genus Oceanodroma Family Oceanitidae - southern storm petrels
 Genus Fregetta
 Genus Garrodia - grey-backed storm petrel
 Genus Nesofregetta - Polynesian storm petrel
 Genus Oceanites
 Genus Pelagodroma - white-faced storm petrel Family Procellariidae Genus Aphrodroma - Kerguelen petrel
 Genus Ardenna
 Genus Bulweria
 Genus Calonectris
 Genus Daption - Cape petrel
 Genus Fulmarus - fulmars
 Genus Halobaena - blue petrel
 Genus Macronectes - giant petrels
 Genus Pachyptila
 Genus Pagodroma - snow petrel
 Genus Pelecanoides - diving petrels
 Genus Procellaria
 Genus Pseudobulweria
 Genus Pterodroma - gadfly petrels
 Genus Puffinus
 Genus Thalassoica - Antarctic petrel

Psittaciformes

Parrots, parakeets, macaws, and cockatoos Family Cacatuidae - cockatoos
 Genus Cacatua
 Genus Callocephalon - gang-gang cockatoo
 Genus Calyptorhynchus
 Genus Eolophus - galah
 Genus Lophochroa - Major Mitchell's cockatoo
 Genus Nymphicus - cockatiel
 Genus Probosciger - palm cockatoo Family Nestoridae - New Zealand parrots
 Genus Nestor Family Psittacidae - New World and African parrots
 Genus Alipiopsitta - yellow-faced parrot
 Genus Amazona - "Amazons"
 Genus Anodorhynchus
 Genus Ara
 Genus Aratinga
 Genus Bolborhynchus
 Genus Brotogeris
 Genus Conuropsis - Carolina parakeet
 Genus Coracopsis - Vasa parrot
 Genus Cyanoliseus - burrowing parrot
 Genus Cyanopsitta - Spix's macaw
 Genus Deroptyus – red-fan parrot
 Genus Diopsittaca - red-shouldered macaw
 Genus Enicognathus
 Genus Eupsittula
 Genus Forpus
 Genus Graydidascalus - short-tailed parrot
 Genus Guaruba - golden parakeet
 Genus Hapalopsittaca
 Genus Leptosittaca - golden-plumed parakeet
 Genus Myiopsitta
 Genus Nannopsittaca
 Genus Ognorhynchus - yellow-eared parrot
 Genus Orthopsittaca - red-bellied macaw
 Genus Pionites – caiques
 Genus Pionopsitta - pileated parrot
 Genus Pionus
 Genus Poicephalus
 Genus Primolius
 Genus Psilopsiagon
 Genus Psittacara
 Genus Psittacus – grey parrot and Timneh parrot 
 Genus Pyrilia
 Genus Pyrrhura
 Genus Rhynchopsitta
 Genus Thectocercus - blue-crowned parakeet
 Genus Touit
 Genus Triclaria - blue-bellied parrot Family Psittaculidae - Old World parrots
 Genus Agapornis - lovebirds
 Genus Alisterus
 Genus Aprosmictus
 Genus Barnardius - Australian ringneck (sometimes included in Platycercus)
 Genus Bolbopsittacus - guaiabero
 Genus Chalcopsitta
 Genus Charmosyna
 Genus Cyanoramphus
 Genus Cyclopsitta
 Genus Eclectus
 Genus Eos
 Genus Eunymphicus
 Genus Geoffroyus
 Genus Glossopsitta - musk lorikeet
 Genus Lathamus - swift parrot
 Genus Loriculus - hanging parrot
 Genus Lorius
 Genus Melopsittacus - budgerigar
 Genus Micropsitta - pygmy parrot
 Genus Neophema
 Genus Neopsephotus - Bourke's parrot (sometimes included in Neophema)
 Genus Neopsittacus
 Genus Northiella - bluebonnet (often included in Psephotus)
 Genus Oreopsittacus - plum-faced lorikeet
 Genus Parvipsitta
 Genus Pezoporus
 Genus Phigys - collared lory
 Genus Platycercus - rosellas
 Genus Polytelis
 Genus Prioniturus - racket-tails
 Genus Prosopeia - shining parrot
 Genus Psephotellus
 Genus Psephotus - red-rumped parrot
 Genus Pseudeos
 Genus Psittacella - tiger parrot
 Genus Psittacula
 Genus Psittaculirostris
 Genus Psitteuteles (sometimes classified in the Trichoglossus)
 Genus Psittinus
 Genus Purpureicephalus - red-capped parrot
 Genus Tanygnathus
 Genus Trichoglossus
 Genus Vini Family Psittrichasiidae Genus Coracopsis - Vasa parrot
 Genus Psittrichas - Pesquet's parrot Family Strigopidae Genus Strigops - kakapo

Pterocliformes Family Pteroclidae - sandgrouse
 Genus Calopterocles
 Genus Nyctiperdix
 Genus Pterocles
 Genus Syrrhaptes

Rheiformes Family Rheidae Genus Rhea

Sphenisciformes Family Spheniscidae - penguins
 Genus Aptenodytes
 Genus Eudyptes - crested penguins
 Genus Eudyptula
 Genus Megadyptes
 Genus Pygoscelis
 Genus Spheniscus - banded penguins

Strigiformes

Owls Family Strigidae - true owls
 Genus Aegolius – saw-whet owls
 Genus Asio – eared owls
 Genus Athene
 Genus Bubo – horned owls (paraphyletic with Nyctea, Ketupa, and Scotopelia)
 Genus Ciccaba
 Genus Glaucidium – pygmy owls
 Genus Jubula – maned owl
 Genus Lophostrix – crested owl
 Genus Margarobyas – bare-legged owl
 Genus Megascops – screech owls
 Genus Micrathene – elf owl
 Genus Nesasio – fearful owl
 Genus Ninox – Asian and Australasian hawk-owls and boobooks
 Genus Otus – scops owls (probably paraphyletic)
 Genus Pseudoscops – Jamaican owl
 Genus Psiloscops – flammulated owl
 Genus Ptilopsis – white-faced owl
 Genus Pulsatrix – spectacled owl
 Genus Pyrroglaux – Palau owl
 Genus Scotopelia - fishing owls
 Genus Strix – earless owls
 Genus Surnia – northern hawk-owl
 Genus Uroglaux – Papuan hawk-owl
 Genus Xenoglaux – long-whiskered owlet Family Tytonidae - barn owls
 Genus Phodilus - bay owls
 Genus Tyto

StruthioniformesFamily Struthionidae - ostriches
 Genus Struthio

Suliformes

Boobies, gannets, frigatebirds, cormorants, shags, and darters Family Anhingidae Genus Anhinga - darters and anhinga Family Fregatidae Genus Fregata - frigatebirds Family Phalacrocoracidae Genus Phalacrocorax - cormorants and shags Family Sulidae Genus Morus - gannets
 Genus Papasula - Abbott's booby
 Genus Sula - boobies

Tinamiformes Family Tinamidae - tinamous
 Genus Crypturellus
 Genus Eudromia
 Genus Nothocercus
 Genus Nothoprocta
 Genus Nothura
 Genus Rhynchotus
 Genus Taoniscus - dwarf tinamou
 Genus Tinamotis
 Genus Tinamus

Trogoniformes

Trogons and quetzals Family Trogonidae' 
 Genus Apalharpactes Genus Apaloderma Genus Euptilotis - eared quetzal
 Genus Harpactes Genus Pharomachrus Genus Priotelus Genus Trogon''

 
Birds
Birds
Bird Genera